The Coke Zero Sugar 400 is an annual NASCAR Cup Series stock car race at Daytona International Speedway. First held in 1959, the event consists of 160 laps, and is the second of two major stock car events held at Daytona on the Cup Series circuit, the other being the Daytona 500. From its inception through 2019, it was traditionally held on or around the United States' Independence Day. From 1988 until 2019, the race was scheduled for the first Saturday of July – that closest to July 4. In 1998, it became the first stock car race at Daytona to be held at night under-the-lights. In 2020, the race was moved to late August and currently serves as the final race of the Cup Series regular season.

From 1984 to 2007, the race was sponsored by PepsiCo, and for many years was known as the Pepsi 400. In 2008, as part of a multi-year deal, The Coca-Cola Company became the exclusive beverage supplier of ISC tracks, including Daytona. Title sponsorship for this race was also included, with the Coca-Cola Zero Sugar brand having been used each year.

The event is recently known for its close finishes, posting a 0.154s-average margin of victory in its last 21 races, including the tied fourth-closest margin of victory in NASCAR Cup Series history at 0.005s and high-speed, high-density crashes under the lights and a broad display of fireworks during post-race celebrations.

Austin Dillon is the defending winner of the race.

History

1959–1969
Prior to the opening of the track, and prior to the inaugural Daytona 500, tentative plans were made to host a 300-mile USAC Championship (Indycar) race on Independence Day weekend of 1959. However, following two separate fatal accidents to drivers Marshall Teague (testing) and George Amick (Daytona 100), speedway officials canceled the race, citing dangerously high speeds, as well as a low turnout. Bill France Sr. announced plans to hold a 100-lap/250-mile NASCAR stock car race instead, scheduled for July 4.

The race was named the Firecracker 250 because the race would be held on the United States' Independence Day; fireworks are a traditional custom for U.S. Independence Day celebrations. Bill France announced on July 1 that the winner of the race would receive the Marshall Teague Memorial trophy, a trophy honoring and commemorating the life of Teague, who had died in February. The trophy had been presented by Teague's daughter and widow.

The inaugural race was held on July 4, 1959. It was scheduled to start at 11 a.m. to limit the possibility of afternoon interference from thunderstorms common to Florida and to exploit the potential for competitors meeting relatives and friends for an afternoon of fun at the nearby beaches. Before the race, preliminary activities took place, including a Miss Dixie pageant, where twenty aspiring pageant winning hopefuls marched to showcase their bathing suits. With 12,900 spectators in attendance, the race ran its scheduled 250 miles with no caution flags, and with a 57-second lead over runner-up Joe Weatherly, Daytona Beach native Fireball Roberts won in dominating fashion leading 84 of 100 laps. Over the course of the next three years, a couple of NASCAR's top drivers would go on to win the Firecracker 250, including Jack Smith, David Pearson, and a repeat victory in 1962 for Fireball Roberts.

The expansion was needed. In just three years from the race's inaugural event attendance had grown by more than 10,000 spectators, as tourists flocked to the beaches for the holidays. In 1963, the race was expanded from 100 laps to 160 laps, for a distance of 400 miles and subsequently became known as the Firecracker 400. In the same year, Fireball Roberts drove his 1963 Ford to victory, becoming the first driver to win back-to-back events, barely beating Fred Lorenzen.  Roberts was unable to go for three straight wins due to his death on July 2, 1964.

Richard Petty was the man to beat during the sixth annual 400-mile July race, but on lap 103, engine problems cost him a chance at victory. Over the course of the final 56 laps, Bobby Isaac and rookie teammate A. J. Foyt swapped the lead 15 times. Coming out of the fourth turn, Foyt was able to barely edge out Isaac to the stripe; giving Foyt his first career NASCAR victory in only his tenth start. One year later Foyt got his second career win, becoming the second driver to win back-to-back Firecracker races.

Foyt did not try to defend the title of reigning race winner in 1966. Instead, it was the dark horse 1965 Rookie of the Year driver Sam McQuagg winning the race. McQuagg collected his first and only NASCAR victory driving a 1966 Dodge Charger while utilizing a new racing mechanism: the rear 'spoiler'. The air cutting spoiler allowed McQuagg to shatter Foyt's 151.451 mph race average set two years prior. Only two cars finished on the lead lap and the margin of victory to second place driver Darel Dieringer was sixty-six seconds.

In late March 1969 William France, Sr. invited all surviving Medal of Honor recipients to attend the July 4 race, dubbed the Medal of Honor Firecracker 400. Chairman of the House Armed Services Committee would arrange for the heroes and their families to be flown in via military aircraft. 100 members from 31 states would attend the race with Thomas J. Kelly the president of The Medal of Honor Society as the grand marshal. With success, France Sr. invited them on two more occasions in 1971 and 1973, won by Bobby Isaac and David Pearson respectively.

1970s

In 1974, the maneuver used by David Pearson to win his third straight Firecracker race would be talked about well after he crossed the stripe. After collecting the white flag Pearson slowed his Wood Brothers 73' Mercury to allow Richard Petty to jump out to a seven-car lead. Following the race, Pearson was quoted saying "I thought Petty might be able to slingshot and draft past me on that last lap and that's why I didn't want to be leading..." Using the draft Pearson was able to close on Petty into the final turn and eventually passed him coming to the tri-oval for the win. Eight seconds behind the Pearson-Petty duel, Buddy Baker and Cale Yarborough seemed to have crossed the finish line at the same time. After two hours of deliberation, officials announced a dead heat for third place, the only tie recorded in NASCAR history. During the race, nine different drivers exchanged the lead 49 times, a race record that stood until it was broken with 57 between 25 different drivers in 2011.

After the 1974 Firecracker 400, David Pearson became the first and only driver to win three consecutive races and the first to win four July events. Before the 1975 race, he would try to extend his streak to five wins. However, with 19 laps remaining Pearson ended up having oil line complications and finished the race in the 20th position. Instead, five-time winning Daytona 500 driver Richard Petty, finally won the Daytona July race by edging out Buddy Baker, after 17 years of trying.

In 1977 Richard Petty collected his second win at Daytona in July, and it took almost four hours as the Firecracker witnessed its first rain-delayed race. Among the lineup were three female drivers; Lella Lombardi, Christine Beckers, and Janet Guthrie, who finished 31st, 37th, and 40th respectively. The following year, 1978, Pearson collected his final win at the track, becoming the only driver to win five July Daytona races, and became the most-winning driver at Daytona International Speedway with five wins, until Richard Petty won the Daytona 500 the following year.

1980–1997
In 1980, due to a tax dispute with the City of Daytona Beach and Volusia County, Bill France openly threatened to move the Firecracker 400 to the Indianapolis Motor Speedway. A few weeks later, however, the parties reconciled, and the plan to move the race was withdrawn.

In 1985, the race became known as the Pepsi Firecracker 400, when PepsiCo became the event's first title sponsor. In 1989, the "Firecracker" moniker was dropped, and the race was known simply as the Pepsi 400 through 2007.

From 1959 to 1987, the race was always scheduled for July 4, regardless of the day of the week. Beginning in 1988, the race was moved to the first Saturday of July (that nearest to July 4). Going forward, the race would only be held on July 4 in years in which it fell on Saturday. Subsequent to this, the 1992 and 2009 races fell on July 4. Situated in early July, the race traditionally found itself falling at or very near the halfway point of the NASCAR season.

On July 4, 1987, in the wake of Bobby Allison's massive crash at Talladega, the cars were fitted with 390 CFM carburetors. The change helped slow the cars down several mph. On the final lap, Ken Schrader flipped upside-down in the tri-oval as the field crossed the finish line. It would be the final race at Daytona without restrictor plates. 

From 1959 to 1997, the race was scheduled to begin in the morning (10:00 a.m. or 11:00 a.m. eastern). This was to avoid hot summer temperatures and the frequent mid-afternoon thunderstorms in Florida. It was also a "chamber of commerce" goodwill effort by track management to boost the local tourism industry. It left ample time in the afternoon for fans to depart the speedway and visit the nearby beaches and attractions. Participants were even said to have exploited the time to also visit the beaches with their families, treating the event as a mini-vacation from the busy grind of the racing season.

During live ESPN telecasts, the term "Breakfast at Daytona" was used, a gesture to NBC's popular "Breakfast at Wimbledon", taking place the same weekend. The 1997 race was the final time the 400 was scheduled to begin in the morning and run during the daytime.

1998–2019
In July 1997, Daytona International Speedway announced a massive lighting project to be constructed by MUSCO lighting, the same company that installed lights at Charlotte. Plans called for the 1998 Pepsi 400 to be held under-the-lights in primetime. Going forwards, the race would typically be scheduled for Saturday night of July 4 weekend, and created the potential for more comfortable conditions for fans, and a larger primetime television audience. It would be the longest speedway with a night race, and the first restrictor-plate race held at night.

On July 4, 1998, however, the race had to be postponed. Wildfires in Florida consumed the surrounding areas, and the track was converted into a firefighters' staging area. Track officials rescheduled the race for October 17, and the race was successfully held under the lights for the first time, in front of a near-sellout crowd–a first for the event. In 1999, the race returned to the traditional July 4 weekend slot and continues to be scheduled as a night race.

From 1998 to 2002, the race was subtitled the "Pepsi 400 at Daytona" to differentiate it from another race titled the Pepsi 400, held at Michigan during that time frame. In 2008, the long partnership with PepsiCo ended, and the race sponsorship changed to Coca-Cola. For the next ten seasons, the race would be called the Coke Zero 400, highlighting the Coke Zero brand.

Since 2002, the NASCAR Xfinity Series Firecracker 250 race is held on Friday night.

During the 2010 race, NASCAR Chief Marketing Officer Steve Phelps was featured on the CBS reality show Undercover Boss. Scenes from the program were filmed at the race weekend.

2020–present
In 2020, the Coke Zero 400 was moved from its traditional Independence Day weekend date to late August. It serves as the final race of the NASCAR "regular season" before the NASCAR playoffs begin. The race continued to be held as a night race. The Brickyard 400 took the July 4 weekend date.

Presidential visits

With the race's fundamental link to Independence Day, U.S. Presidents have been in attendance on two notable occasions.

On July 4, 1984, President Ronald Reagan became the first sitting U.S. President to attend a NASCAR race. The President gave the starting command by phone from aboard Air Force One. Landing at Daytona, the President proceeded to the track and viewed the race with Bill France Jr. During his time at the race, Reagan was interviewed by Ned Jarrett, who in 1978 had begun a career as a radio race broadcaster. The 1984 Firecracker 400 is also legendary since it was the race at which Richard Petty achieved his unparalleled 200th (and final) win. Petty and President Reagan were interviewed together following the race, and the President joined Richard Petty and his family in Victory Lane.

On July 4, 1992, President George H. W. Bush attended the race, which served as a Daytona farewell tribute to Richard Petty during his "Fan Appreciation Tour." Bush, on the 1992 campaign trail, participated in pre-race festivities, gave the starting command, and rode around the track in the pace car during the pace laps. Petty qualified a strong second, and led the first 5 laps of the race, and quickly fell back to the end of the field. He succumbed to heat exhaustion, however and dropped out four laps beyond the halfway point.

On July 1, 2000, the Texas governor and future president George W. Bush attended the race while on the campaign trail, and gave the starting command. Bush was courting the so-called NASCAR dad demographic, as well as the hotly contested Florida vote in particular.

First wins
The Coke Zero Sugar 400 has produced a number of drivers' first career NASCAR Grand National/Cup Series victories. Drivers include A. J. Foyt, Sam McQuagg, Greg Sacks, Jimmy Spencer, John Andretti, Greg Biffle, David Ragan, Aric Almirola, Erik Jones, Justin Haley, and William Byron. For McQuagg, Sacks, and Haley, the win is the only victory in their respective Cup Series careers.

The 400 has also marked the first of multiple points-paying victories at Daytona for a total of seven drivers, including Jeff Gordon (1995), Dale Earnhardt - after 24 previous attempts from 1978 to 1990, Dale Earnhardt Jr. (2001), and Jamie McMurray (2007). David Pearson won the 400 four times prior to finally winning the Daytona 500 in 1976, and Dale Earnhardt won the 400 twice before his 1998 Daytona 500 victory.

In 2000, it was Jeff Burton's first restrictor-plate win. In addition, Tony Stewart won the 400 four times but never won the Daytona 500 (his best finish being second in 2004).

Past winners

Notes

Races extended due to NASCAR overtime: 2008, 2010–11, 2013, 2015–18, 2020–21.1996, 2014 & 2019: Races shortened due to rain.1998: Postponed to October 17 due to Florida wildfires.2004–05 & 2010: Races postponed same day due to rain; ran on Saturday and ended after midnight on Sunday.2014, 2019 & 2022: Race postponed from Saturday night to Sunday  due to rain 2015: Moved from Saturday to Sunday by host broadcaster NBC, postponed same day due to rain, and ended after midnight on Monday.

Multiple winners (drivers)

Multiple winners (teams)

Manufacturer wins

Race summaries
 1963 
The Firecracker race was lengthened from 250 miles to 400 in 1963, and one of Fireball Roberts' final wins came in this race. In a highly competitive race (39 official lead changes among Roberts, Fred Lorenzen,  Marvin Panch, Tiny Lund, Junior Johnson, and Jim Paschal) Johnson won the pole and led 66 laps until falling out with a burned piston while leading with 50 laps to go.  Lorenzen took over and the two Fords battled until Roberts passed Lorenzen on the final lap.

 1964 
The Hemi-head Dodges dominated the big tracks in 1964, and in the Firecracker that July Richard Petty led all but one of the first 103 laps, but then blew up. That season's Indianapolis champion, A. J. Foyt was entered in a Ray Nichels Dodge and after Petty fell out Foyt fought it out with teammate Bobby Isaac; the lead bounced around 17 times between the two before Foyt won on the final lap. The weekend was marred, however, as Fred Lorenzen was injured in a bad crash during practice, and word came down that Fireball Roberts had died of injuries sustained in a savage fire in the World 600 six weeks earlier.

 1971 
Restrictor plates debuted in NASCAR in August 1970 and had become a constant source of controversy in 1971 over differing plate sizes for different engines. Team owner Nord Krauskopf withdrew the #71 Dodges of Bobby Isaac after the Motor State 400 in June, but for July was persuaded by crew chief Harry Hyde to enter with a wedge-head engine, which was allowed a larger plate than Hemi-head engines. Isaac started the Firecracker 21st but raced to the front quickly. His Dodge and that of Buddy Baker raced the Plymouths of Richard Petty and Pete Hamilton all day; these four cars led 145 of 160 laps and Isaac led a four-car sweep of the top spots, this despite nearly being black flagged for a broken hood pin that began bending his hood toward his windshield. The lead changed 35 times among eight drivers.

 1974 
This remains the most audacious finish in NASCAR history. David Pearson had become a superspeedway power in the Wood Brothers Mercury starting in April 1972 and by the 1974 Firecracker had won 20 times in the #21, including back-to-back Firecracker 400s in close battles over Richard Petty. The 1974 Firecracker began as a multicar battle between Pearson, the Allison brothers (Bobby and Donnie), A. J. Foyt, Buddy Baker, Cale Yarborough, and Petty. The lead changed 45 times (a race record broken in 2010 and tied in 2021) among nine drivers. Bobby Allison debuted in Roger Penske's AMC Matador and led 50 laps; a broken intake valve dropped him out of contention in the final 20 laps but he still finished fifth.  Pearson, Petty, Baker, and Cale were now alone for the win and the finish shook into a Pearson-Petty showdown with Baker and Cale left some seven seconds back racing for third. Petty was in the draft of Pearson, waiting for the last moment to storm past with no chance of a counterattack by Pearson. Knowing this, Pearson took the white flag and immediately hit his brakes, forcing a surprised Petty to swerve right and take the lead; Petty took a seven car-length lead, but Pearson got back on the gas and caught Petty's draft; he shot forward and in Four swung underneath Petty, who swerved to cut him off but left room for Pearson to clear; both cars nonetheless got loose but corrected.  Pearson took the win and it left Petty angry enough that he confronted Pearson in the press box after the race.  Amid all this, Baker and Cale hit the stripe for third at an exact instant, the first tie in modern NASCAR history.

 1977 
Petty won the Firecracker in 1975, and in 1977 he rebounded from a disappointing 1976 season to win four races in the season's first half. This race saw the entry of female racers Janet Guthrie, Christine Beckers, and Lella Lombardi; none, however, were around at the end as a very competitive multicar battle - primarily a Bobby Allison/Cale Yarborough fight but also including Donnie Allison, A. J. Foyt, and Darrell Waltrip - in the first 50 laps gave way to a runaway by Petty. "I wish people would stop complaining about the Chevrolets," runner-up Waltrip said afterward.  "A Dodge (Neil Bonnett who led one lap and finished eighth despite losing power on the start) won the pole and Petty blew my doors off."

 1980 
The lead changed 41 times among nine drivers as sophomore sensation Dale Earnhardt tried to run down the Bud Moore Mercury of Bobby Allison; Earnhardt, though, got into a race with David Pearson and this allowed Allison to breeze to the win. The final lap, however, saw a huge crash well after Allison took the win, as Phil Finney spun off turn 4, plowed into an earth embankment, and flew 20 feet off the ground before landing at the pit entrance.

 1981 
Cale Yarborough passed Harry Gant on the final lap for the win.

 1982 
“Geoff Bodine tried to kick my Pontiac for a field goal," said Richard Petty of a late-race melee that eliminated him, Harry Gant, and several others chasing Bobby Allison. Allison edged Bill Elliott for the win and a Daytona season sweep.

 1984 
Petty ground past Cale Yarborough racing to the race-ending yellow in front of President Reagan for his 200th NASCAR win.

 1985 
Greg Sacks scored his first and only NASCAR Winston Cup Series victory in one of the race's biggest upsets. Bill Elliott (who won the Daytona 500 earlier in the year) started on the pole position, and was the heavy favorite going into the race. Elliott led 103 laps, but mechanical problems dropped him to second at the finish.

Sack's Gardner R&D entry was merely a one-off research and development team for DiGard Motorsports and primary driver Bobby Allison. Sack's car had no sponsorship, and a pick-up pit crew that was hired the week of the race. They even had to change their car number from #1 to #10 after they discovered they did not have rights to that number. The crew was said to have employed some innovative and unconventional setups, and was even later accused of using an oversized engine. Sacks lost his two-way radio communication, and during the race, crew chief Gary Nelson was able to recruit more pit help from teams that had dropped out of the race. During the first half, Elliott and Sacks emerged as the front-runners, pulling out at times to a sizeable lead ahead of the rest of the pack.

Late in the race, Elliott was suffering from a vibration, which affected his handling and shook the fuel pickup loose. He was forced to pit for fuel with 8 laps to go, handing the lead and ultimately the victory to Sacks. Without a radio, and stretching his fuel for 39 laps, Sacks slingshot past the lap car of Terry Labonte just before the finish line, and won by 23 seconds. Two weeks later, Allison quit the DiGard team and Sacks was hired to replace him.

 1986 
Tim Richmond won his only Daytona race as a late-race wreck eliminated Buddy Baker and Dale Earnhardt.

 1987 
The race was run with smaller carburetors following Bobby Allison's Talladega crash; Allison got back on the lead lap in the final laps, then in a five-lap finish bolted past Dave Marcis, Harry Gant, and Ken Schrader to the win, to the surprise of many (including the race's broadcaster ABC Sports) who thought he was still a lap down. On the final lap Schrader, blew a tire and flipped into Gant, nearly climbing the fencing; NASCAR went from smaller carburetors to restrictor plates after 1987.

 1988 
In the first restrictor-plate Firecracker 400 since 1973, Bill Elliott edged upstart Rick Wilson by 18 inches in a five-car scramble.

 1989 
Mark Martin came back from a mid-race spin but ran out of gas in the final laps. Davey Allison edged Morgan Shepherd, who misread the flags and thought the final lap was two to go. Lake Speed survived a violent melee on the backstretch when he side slammed Sterling Marlin and Marlin bounced back into him.

 1990 
Dale Earnhardt won his first Winston Cup race at Daytona after a plethora of wins in Busch Clash, IROC, and Gatorade 125s over the years.  A 20-car melee erupted at the end of the opening lap as Greg Sacks made contact with Derrike Cope as they were racing for seventh with Richard Petty; the two cars spun into Petty and most of the field behind them plowed into the mess - Geoff Bodine caustically referenced the fact Sacks had participated heavily in filming the much-criticized racing film Days Of Thunder by saying “I guess they saw the damned movie.”  Earnhardt dominated the race against a depleted field the rest of the way.

 1991 
Battling down the backstretch, Sterling Marlin and Alan Kulwicki made contact, pushing Kulwicki into Darrell Waltrip. Waltrip's car was subsequently pushed down low into Joe Ruttman and went spinning wildly to the infield. Waltrip's car started barrel-rolling and was heavily damaged. Bill Elliott won the race, his last victory for Melling Racing and the only victory for Elliott in a car painted a color other than red.

 1992 
With President George H. W. Bush in attendance, Richard Petty was honored during the pre-race ceremonies for his final race at Daytona. Petty qualified on the outside of the front row and led the first five laps of the race. Ernie Irvan held off Sterling Marlin at the finish line in a race slowed only by two brief cautions.

 1993 
The field came down for a restart with 9 laps to go with Dale Earnhardt leading. Ken Schrader was tucked in closely behind Earnhardt in second place, while Sterling Marlin was in third. Down the backstretch on the final lap, Schrader went high trying to pass for the lead, but Earnhardt was able to block him. Marlin dove low to pass Earnhardt, but was running out of the room, and emerged side by side with Schrader in turn three. Earnhardt drove to victory, and Marlin nipped Schrader for second place by inches at the finish line.

 1994 
Jimmy Spencer, driving as a teammate to Bill Elliott at Junior Johnson & Associates, won his first Winston Cup Series race. In the closing laps, Ernie Irvan led Spencer, Dale Earnhardt, and Mark Martin. Spencer was tucked in nose-to-tail behind Irvan, waiting until the final lap to make his move. At the white flag, Spencer went high in turn one, building momentum as he came off of turn two. Down the backstretch, Spencer pulled alongside Ivan, and inched ahead going into turn three. Out of turn four, the two cars were side-by-side, with Spencer taking the checkered flag by about half a car length. Spencer led only 1 lap (the final lap) during the entire race.

 1995 
Jeff Gordon was battling Dale Earnhardt in the closing laps. With just under four laps to go, Mike Wallace wrecked in turn three, bringing out the yellow. Gordon led Earnhardt back to the line, but safety crews cleaned up the incident quickly. The green and white flag came out for a wild one-lap dash to the finish. Sterling Marlin tried to pass Earnhardt for second place in turn one, the two cars touched, and Earnhardt held the position. Gordon pulled out to a lead down the backstretch, while Marlin passed Earnhardt on the high side going into turn three. Gordon won, while Marlin and Earnhardt were side by side for second and third.

 1996 
Rain delayed the start of the race until mid-afternoon. Sterling Marlin dominated most of the race, leading a total of 88 laps. With rain quickly approaching the area on lap 117, Marlin led Terry Labonte and Jeff Gordon, with Dale Earnhardt taking fourth down the backstretch. Seconds later, the yellow flag came out for rain, and the leaders raced to the start/finish line for what might be the end of the race. Marlin held off Labonte at the line,  to lead the race under the caution. Shortly after, the red flag was displayed, and Marlin was declared the winner.

 1997 
John Andretti dominated en route to his first Winston Cup win and the only win for Cale Yarborough as a car owner. A crash with five laps to go involving Michael Waltrip, Hut Stricklin, and Ricky Rudd, set up a restart with one lap to go. The green and white flags waved together with Andretti leading and Dale Earnhardt right on his bumper. But Earnhardt was having difficulty with restarts and ended up mired in a battle for second with Dale Jarrett, Terry Labonte, and Sterling Marlin, while Andretti easily pulled away for the victory. Entering turn three, Mark Martin tried to pass between two other cars and but triggered a huge melee, wrecking several cars. Earnhardt fell back to fourth at the finish line, passed first by Labonte, then nipped at the line by Marlin. Jarrett came home 5th after amazingly avoiding the big crash by mere inches.

 1998 
The first super speedway night race at Daytona was scheduled for Saturday, July 4, but wildfires in the area forced the race to be postponed until October. During pre-race ceremonies, firefighters and first responders who fought the blazes were honored. A red flag for a brief rain shower halted the race with 5 laps to go. Jeff Gordon was leading at the restart and held off the challenges for the win. Daytona 500 winner Dale Earnhardt lost time in the pits when he hit an errant tire and dragged it on his front bumper trying to exit the pit lane.

 1999 
Dale Jarrett led the field in the closing laps but was running low on fuel. With less than four laps to go, Dale Earnhardt charged into second and set his sights on the leader. As the field came down for three laps to go, a spin involving Jeremy Mayfield, Elliott Sadler, and Jimmy Spencer brought out the yellow, and the field raced back to the caution. Jarrett held off Earnhardt at the line to hold the lead the next time. Running low on fuel, Jarrett coasted around the apron behind the pace car for the final two laps and secured the victory.

 2000 
Jeff Burton was leading Daytona 500 winner Dale Jarrett in the closing laps when Jimmy Spencer spun on the backstretch with six laps to go. The caution bunched the field for a restart with four laps to go. Burton blocked every attempt Jarrett made to take the lead, while Dale Earnhardt was ganged up on by Ford drivers, and was shuffled from 3rd to 8th. Burton won his first of two restrictor-plate races, and Ford swept the top five positions for the first time in 400 history. This race was also the final NASCAR Winston Cup Series race that was broadcast by CBS ending their 22-year relationship with NASCAR dating back to their first broadcast of the 1979 Daytona 500.

 2001 
Dale Earnhardt Jr. dominated the race, leading for 116 laps, and won the first race to be held at Daytona since his father's death at the Daytona 500. He and Michael Waltrip finished in reverse order of the Daytona 500 and the entire DEI team celebrated their emotional victory to honor the deceased Dale Earnhardt. Controversy also marred the race: before the final restart, NASCAR had promised Tony Stewart a bonus money prize if he had a better finish than 3rd place. Stewart decided to go for the win and bonus money but with 5 laps left he slid his car completely below the yellow line to avoid crashing with Jeremy Mayfield. Instantly NASCAR penalized Stewart when he came back by. Stewart ignored the order and despite finishing sixth was penalized to being 26th, and the last car on the lead lap. In response, Stewart went to confront the NASCAR director Gary Nelson. On the way, he slapped a reporter and threw his tape recorder away. For his actions, Stewart was fined a total of $15,000 and put on indefinite probation for the season.

 2002 
On lap 137, Dale Jarrett and Jeff Burton got together on the apron approaching turn 1, triggering a 14-car pile-up. Michael Waltrip dominated the end of the race, even after being separated from his teammate and drafting partner Dale Earnhardt Jr. A late-race caution secured the victory a couple of laps early for Waltrip, but controversy erupted when NASCAR chose not to red flag the race and ensure a green-flag finish. Displeased fans around the track pelted the course with cans and other debris. After tragedy overshadowed Waltrip's previous win, this time Waltrip was able to enjoy the celebrations of victory at Daytona.

 2003 
The race is famous for one of the longest green flag runs ever. There were only two brief yellows in the first half for a total of ten laps. The final 81 laps (the entire second half) were run under the green flag, setting up a finish where fuel strategy was going to be key to deciding the winner. Rookie Greg Biffle won the event for his first Cup Series victory. His win was an upset after Bobby Labonte ran out of gas in the final laps, likewise, Kevin Harvick led the most laps at 54, but also failed to win.

 2004 
Jeff Gordon in his Pepsi sponsored car won with a drafting push from Hendrick Motorsports teammate Jimmie Johnson; Gordon became the first and driver to win the race in a car sporting the race sponsor.  A variation of the race's final laps was featured in the prologue of the video game NASCAR 06: Total Team Control.

 2005 
Rain delayed the start until about 10:42 p.m. ET when the race started under the safety car for the first 11 laps. Tony Stewart took the victory, his first point-paying win at Daytona. After he took the checkered flag, he climbed the catch fence (mimicking a tradition made popular by Hélio Castroneves at the Indy 500) and actually climbed into the flag stand to retrieve the checkered flag. The race finished at 1:40 AM ET

 2006 
The race pole position was won by Boris Said and after finding himself in the top ten the entire race, Boris Said contended to win the race. But in the final three laps when Boris was about to win the big event, Tony Stewart with help from Kyle Busch was pushed past Boris to the lead and Tony Stewart won the race for a second consecutive time when a caution came out in the final lap. Boris Said in his career-best performance in the NSCS ended up 4th and emotionally said after the race that the 2006 Pepsi 400 was the best part of his career. Tony Stewart climbed the catch fence like the previous year to remind the world of his win at Indianapolis the year before but said he was so crowded from the fans that roared for him that he never wanted to do it again although he still did in his future Firecracker 400 wins.

 2007 
In the last use of the Gen-4 car at Daytona (or any restrictor-plate race for that matter), Jamie McMurray and Kyle Busch raced side by side for the final five laps and McMurray won by inches, scoring his second career win, and first in nearly five years.

 2008 
Kyle Busch led 31 laps and won his first Daytona event and the first 400 race at Daytona sponsored by Coke Zero. The race was largely dominated by Hendrick Motorsports teammates Jeff Gordon and Dale Earnhardt Jr. who combined to lead 97 of the 160 laps. Tony Stewart climbed out of his car at lap 27 due to illness and was replaced by J.J. Yeley. A series of late-race cautions shuffled the running order for the final restart which saw Carl Edwards mount a charge to the outside of Kyle Busch. The cars appeared dead even as a multi-car crash brought out the final yellow. NASCAR used scoring loops and video replay to decide that Kyle was in front of Carl at the moment of caution.

 2009 
On the final lap, going into the tri-oval, Kyle Busch was hooked head-on into the wall by Tony Stewart. Busch's car was then hit by Kasey Kahne at an estimated 180 mph, sending the rear of the car airborne. After crossing the start-finish line, Busch suffered a third hit from teammate Joey Logano. Busch walked away from the car uninjured but contends to this day that Stewart, a former teammate of Busch, intentionally wrecked him. However, in victory lane Tony Stewart was saddened about his finish and apologized for the contact; he said and has told to this day that although he got the post-race benefits, he did not and still does not like his victory because he, wrecking Busch to win was humiliating and embarrassing to him and his SHR team.  Had Busch not aggressively raced Stewart hard on the final lap, Busch would have lost fewer points by finishing second or third, and the points eventually cost him a Chase position at the end of the regular season.

 2010 
The 400 was delayed nearly two hours by rain and saw numerous crashes, including a 20-car melee in turn 3 in which Mark Martin had to be helped out of his burning car on pit road. Kyle Busch was leading when he lapped Juan Pablo Montoya on the backstretch and Montoya hooked Busch head-on into the wall, a virtual carbon copy of the last-lap wreck from the year before. Kevin Harvick took the win as Richard Childress Racing's Chevrolets raced together in the top three for much of the race's final quarter. Sam Hornish Jr. spent most of the race in the top five and was in contention for his first-career Cup victory until being tagged in the rear quarter panel by Busch. The lead changed 47 times, a new race record.  This was the final race at Daytona before a repaving project, which started the day after the race.

 2011 
With the two-car tandem draft in effect, and the newly repaved track surface, drivers sought out drafting partners for the race and the lead changed a race-record 56 times. Daytona 500 winner Trevor Bayne was knocked out early, and David Ragan with assistance from RFR teammate Matt Kenseth grabbed his first career Sprint Cup victory, redeeming himself for the restart lane violation that cost him the 500 in February.

 2012 
Roush Fenway Racing teammates Matt Kenseth and Greg Biffle combined to lead 124 laps, but a 15-car wreck in the closing laps set up a late-race restart. On the first attempt at a Green-White-Checkered flag, contact between Kevin Harvick and Greg Biffle detonated an 8-car melee. Tony Stewart (who started 42nd due to a post-qualifying penalty) passed Kenseth off turn two on the final lap and came home a surprise winner.Tony Stewart wins Coke Zero 400

 2013 
Kyle Busch won the pole position, for his first pole spot at Daytona, but Jimmie Johnson dominated the field, leading 94 of 161 laps en route to his first Coke Zero 400 win. This rendered Johnson the first driver to sweep the Daytona 500 and the Coke Zero 400 in the same season since Bobby Allison in 1982. In victory lane, Johnson was emotional; he said his idols Bobby and Davey Allison were what brought him into the desire to become a NASCAR driver and he was so happy to accomplish Bobby's record also. In the final laps, it looked like Tony Stewart or Kevin Harvick would get by Johnson, but Johnson motored away on the restart. There were also multiple crashes throughout the race, including a scary one with 11 laps to go that saw Denny Hamlin catch air in the tri-oval after being hit by A. J. Allmendinger, Jeff Gordon, Matt Kenseth, David Reutimann, and Dave Blaney. There were also two crashes on the last lap – a four-car wreck in turn two, and a six-car wreck in the tri-oval, the race extended due to a Green-white-checkered finish.

 2014 
Aric Almirola grabbed the win after rain first postponed the 400-mile event from its scheduled Saturday night running to Sunday afternoon, then ended the race at 113 laps. He battled Kurt Busch on Lap 98 ahead of a 26-car crash on the backstretch where Kyle Busch ended up on his roof in the apron of turn 3. Almirola won driving Richard Petty's No. 43, the first win for the No. 43 since the 1999 Goody's Body Pain 500 at Martinsville, and first at Daytona since 1984. Austin Dillon, the pole-sitter for the 500 in February, finished fifth, while Danica Patrick finished eighth despite a slow pitstop under green and after barely escaping the Lap 98 crash and receiving damage in a 16-car pileup on Lap 21. Only six cars managed to finish the race without damage, but a total of seventeen cars nonetheless finished on the lead lap.

 2015 
Because of a conflict with Macy's fireworks shows that NBC has broadcast rights, the race was moved to Sunday, The race was aired on NBC Sports after 8 years on TNT, The start of the race was delayed to 11:42 p.m. ET following a rain delay of over three and a half hours, making it the latest the race has started in the history of the race. Due to rain washing out qualifying, Dale Earnhardt Jr. started on the pole based on practice 1 speeds. Earnhardt Jr. dominated the race, leading 96 laps en route to his second victory of the year. However, the win itself was overshadowed by a violent last-lap crash at the checkered flag involving 25 cars, which saw Austin Dillon flip over and fly into the tri-oval catch fence in a way eerily similar to the last-lap wreck by Kyle Larson in the February 2013 Xfinity race that injured thirty-three, and a wreck by Geoff Bodine in the same spot in the inaugural Truck Series race there in 2000. The resulting impact ripped out Dillon's engine, broke a catch fence support, and thirteen fans were injured by flying debris. Eight of the fans declined treatment, the other five were treated and released with four at the infield care center, and one at a local hospital. There were 22 lead changes amongst 12 drivers, and the race ended at 2:38 a.m. Monday morning.

 2016 
The race returned to its scheduled Saturday night date, on July 2, 2016, The start of the race was at 8:14 p.m. EDT, Brad Keselowski grabbed his first win at Daytona, and there were 26 lead changes among 13 different drivers, a multi-car wreck occurred on lap 90 involving 22 cars.

 2017 
Ricky Stenhouse Jr. won his second career win (after winning the spring Talladega race).

 2018 
A large number of early contenders including the entire Penske team were eliminated in a 24 car crash in Turn 3 on Lap 54, caused by Stenhouse turning Brad Keselowski into Kurt Busch near the front of the field. Stenhouse dominated the early stages of the race, but a late-race spin and involvement in a late-race crash dropped him back to a 17th-place finish. With four laps to go, a four-car crash in Turn 3 on lap 157 that eliminated potential darkhorse Michael McDowell from contention set up an overtime situation. Just as Martin Truex Jr. was about to get the white flag on the first overtime attempt, a second Big One unfolded exiting Turn 4, forcing another overtime attempt. A three-way battle for the lead unfolded on the second (and successful) attempt between Truex, Erik Jones, and Kasey Kahne. On the last lap, Jones, with an assist from Chris Buescher, was able to pull away enough from Truex to score his first career Cup victory. Of the 40 cars that started the race, 17 of them finished on the lead lap.

 2020 
Switched from its traditional July 4 week to late August to intensify racing for NASCAR playoff format, the 62nd running was the most competitive since 2011 (35 official lead changes among 16 drivers).  Two big crashes erupted in the final ten laps and resulted in the red flag both times; the second erupted with three to go when Bubba Wallace pushed Joey Logano and both split around race leader Denny Hamlin; Hamlin slammed Logano and Wallace together as William Byron shot the gap four abreast into Turn One and Logano crashed.  Swept into the wreck was Jimmie Johnson in his final Cup season and he was eliminated from NASCAR's playoff run. Byron and Chase Elliott fought off a furious last challenge from Martin Truex Jr. and Hamlin for his first Cup win after 98 starts.  Hendrick Motorsports Chevrolets edged the two Joe Gibbs Racing Toyotas while Wallace stormed the Richard Petty Motorsports 43 past fifteen cars to finish fifth.

Statistics

Consecutive victories
3 consecutive victories
David Pearson (1972, 1973, 1974)
2 consecutive victories
Fireball Roberts (1962, 1963)
A. J. Foyt (1964, 1965)
Cale Yarborough (1967, 1968)
Tony Stewart (2005, 2006)

Coke Zero 400 & Daytona 500
Many drivers who have won the Daytona 500 have also won the Coke Zero 400 at some point in their career. In addition, almost every multiple-time Daytona 500 winner has won at least one Coke Zero 400 in the career, with the exception of Matt Kenseth who has won the Daytona 500 in 2009 and 2012, but never the July race. In the reverse direction, Tony Stewart has won the Coke Zero 400 four times, but never the Daytona 500 (his best 500 finish being second, behind Dale Earnhardt Jr. in 2004). Among the most notable, David Pearson won the 400 four times prior to finally winning the Daytona 500 in 1976.

The drivers who have won the Coke Zero 400 and the Daytona 500 are as follows (Bold''' indicates winning both in the same season):

In 1982, Bobby Allison swept the Busch Clash, Daytona 500 and Firecracker 400 in the same season.

See also
 Wawa 250 – A NASCAR Xfinity Series race that takes place during the same weekend of the Coke Zero Sugar 400
 WeatherTech 240  – A Grand-Am Rolex Sports Car Series race that took place on the same day as the Coke Zero Sugar 400

References

External links
 

1959 establishments in Florida
Coca-Cola
 
NASCAR Cup Series races
Recurring sporting events established in 1959
Independence Day (United States)
Annual sporting events in the United States